Michael Lewis Edwards (born August 27, 1952) is an American former professional baseball second baseman. He played all or part of four seasons in Major League Baseball (MLB) for the Pittsburgh Pirates and Oakland Athletics.

Edwards has two brothers who also played in the major leagues, Dave Edwards and Marshall Edwards, who is Mike's twin.

External links
, or Retrosheet
Venezuelan Winter League

1952 births
Living people
African-American baseball players
American expatriate baseball players in Japan
American expatriate baseball players in Mexico
Baseball players from Washington (state)
Charleston Charlies players
Columbus Clippers players
Diablos Rojos del México players
Kintetsu Buffaloes players
Major League Baseball second basemen
Navegantes del Magallanes players
American expatriate baseball players in Venezuela
Niagara Falls Pirates players
Oakland Athletics players
People from Fort Lewis, Washington
Petroleros de Poza Rica players
Pittsburgh Pirates players
Shreveport Captains players
Sultanes de Monterrey players
Tiburones de La Guaira players
UCLA Bruins baseball players
University of California, Los Angeles alumni
21st-century African-American people
20th-century African-American sportspeople
Jefferson High School (Los Angeles) alumni